L'Eliana is a municipality in the comarca of Camp de Túria in the Valencian Community, Spain.

Neighborhoods 

 Casco Antiguo
 Les Casetes
 La Fonda
 Estació
 Almassereta
 Montesol
 Montealegre
 MontePilar
 Torre del Virrei
 Pinaeta del Cel
 Entrepinos
 Pla de la Paella
 El Carmen
 El Escorial
 San Agustín
 Hendaya
 Vistahermosa
 Los Almendros
 El Paraíso
 Gallipont

Notable people
 Melani García, Spanish classical singer, winner of La Voz Kids 2018, and Spanish entrant for Junior Eurovision Song Contest 2019 with the song "Marte"

International relations

Twin towns — Sister cities
L'Eliana is twinned with:

  Dzerzhinsky, Russia

References

External links
 Official Website of L'Eliana
 Webcam of L'Eliana

Municipalities in Camp de Túria
Populated places in Camp de Túria